James Edwin Addicott (February 23, 1869 – March 22, 1957) was an American football coach and mathematics professor.
He served as the head football coach at San Jose State Normal School (now San José State University) in 1893, 1895 and 1900.

Addicott was a fellow in the mathematics department at San Jose State from 1892 to 1900. He later served as high school principal at Isidore Newman School in New Orleans and San Francisco Polytechnic High School.

References

External links
 

1869 births
1957 deaths
San Jose State Spartans football coaches
Columbia University alumni
Sportspeople from Taunton